Paduka Sri Sultan Mahmud Shah II ibni al-Marhum Sultan Muhammad Jiwa Zainal Adilin Mu'adzam Shah I (died 15 January 1547) was the tenth Sultan of Kedah. His reign was from 1506 to 1547. He changed the name of his realm to Kedah Dar ul-Aman, and established a stable currency and encouraged trade.

External links
 List of Sultans of Kedah

1547 deaths
16th-century Sultans of Kedah